Gary T. Marx (born 1938) is a scholar in the field of sociology. He was born on a farm in central California, raised in Hollywood, and grew up in Berkeley.

Career overview
Gary T. Marx is Professor Emeritus at the Massachusetts Institute of Technology (MIT).  He has worked in the areas of race and ethnicity, collective behavior and social movements, law and society and surveillance studies. He is the author of Protest and Prejudice, Undercover: Police Surveillance in America, Collective Behavior and Social Movements (with Doug McAdam) and editor of  Racial Conflict, Muckraking Sociology, Undercover: Police Surveillance in Comparative Perspective (with C. Fijnaut), Windows Into the Soul: Surveillance and Society in an Age of High Technology (University of Chicago Press, 2016) and other books. With Norman Goodman, he revised Society Today and edited Sociology: Popular and Classical Approaches. He is a contributing author to Harvest of American Racism (University of Michigan Press, 2018).

Undercover received the Outstanding Book Award from the Academy of Criminal Justice Sciences, and Marx was named the American Sociological Association's Jensen Lecturer for 1989–1990. He received the Distinguished Scholar Award from its section on Crime, Law and Deviance, the Silver Gavel Award from the ABA, the Bruce C. Smith Award for research achievement, the W.E.B. Du Bois medal, the Lifetime Achievement Award from the Society for the Study of Social Problems, the inaugural Outstanding Achievement Award from the Surveillance Studies Network, the William F. Ogburn Career Achievement Award, CHOICE Outstanding Academic Title Award 2017, the Goffman Award for Outstanding Scholarship in the Ecology of Social Interaction, and the George Herbert Mead Award for Lifetime Achievement from the Society for the Study of Symbolic Interaction. In 2017 he was awarded a Doctor Honoris Causa from the Vrije Universiteit Brussel.

He has been a research associate at the Harvard-MIT Joint Center for Urban Studies and Harvard Law School's Criminal Justice Center, and a fellow at the Center for Advanced Study in the Behavioral Sciences (1987–88; 1996–97) and the Woodrow Wilson International Center for Scholars (1997–98). In 1970, he received a Guggenheim Fellowship, and he has received grants from the National Institute of Justice, National Science Foundation, The Twentieth Century Fund, The Whiting Foundation, and the German government. In 1992 he was the inaugural Stice Memorial Lecturer in residence at the University of Washington and he has been a UC Irvine Chancellor's Distinguished Fellow, the A.D. Carlson Visiting Distinguished Professor in the Social Sciences at West Virginia University, the Hixon-Riggs Visiting Professor of Science, Technology and Society at Harvey Mudd College, a Ferdinand Braudel Fellow at the European University Institute, and a fellow at the Tilburg Institute for Law, Institute for Law, Technology and Society. He received his Ph.D. from The University of California at Berkeley.

In recent decades he has been working on surveillance issues, illustrating how and why surveillance is neither good nor bad, but context and comportment make it so. He has sought to create a conceptual map of new ways of collecting, analyzing, communicating and using personal information. Explanation and evaluation require a common language for the identification and measurement of surveillance's fundamental properties and contexts (e.g., the new surveillance, surveillance society, maximum security society, surveillance creep; surveillance slack, the softening of surveillance, the myth of surveillance, neutralization and counter-neutralization, and four basic surveillance contexts: coercion, contracts, care, and cross cutting, unprotected "publicly" available data).

His work has appeared or been reprinted in over 300 books, monographs and periodicals and has been translated into Japanese, Chinese, Czech, French, Italian, Spanish, Hebrew, Dutch, German, Russian, Polish, Hungarian, Greek, Turkish, Portuguese, Persian, Macedonian, Slovak, Swedish, Belorussian; and other languages.

His articles have appeared in academic journals such as American Sociological Review, American Journal of Sociology, Social Problems, Annals of the American Academy of Political and Social Science, and many others.

He has also written for popular sources including but not limited to Harvard Business Review, California Monthly, Computerworld, Abacus, The Nation, and The New Republic. He has participated in and helped to develop a number of radio and television documentaries.

Research and consulting work
He has been a consultant to, or served on panels for, national commissions, the House Committee on the Judiciary, the House Science Committee, the Senate Labor and Human Resources Committee, the Government Accountability Office, the Office of Technology Assessment, the Justice Department, and other federal agencies; state and local governments, the European Community and European Parliament, the House of Commons of Canada, The National Academy of Sciences, the Social Science Research Council, the American Association for the Advancement of Science, the U.K. Association of Chief Police Officers, public interest groups, foundations and think tanks. He is a longstanding member of the Sociological Research Association, and a widely experienced teacher and lecturer.

Other professional affiliations
He has been on the executive council of the ASA (and has sat on the committees, or chaired, three of its sections) and on the executive committee of the Eastern Sociological Society. He has been an associate editor, or on the editorial board, of the American Sociological Review, Social Problems, Annual Review of Sociology, Berkeley Journal of Sociology, Journal of Conflict Resolution, Politics and Society, Qualitative Sociology, Crime, Law and Social Change, Studies in Law, Politics and Society, Justice Quarterly, Criminology, Journal of Contingencies and Crisis Management, The Information Society, Policing and Society, The American Sociologist, Ethics and Information Technology, Critical Media Studies, Surveillance and Society, International Political Sociology, Identity in the Information Society, The International Journal of Intelligence Ethics, Criminological Encounters, and Secrecy. He has been book review essay editor for Sociological Forum; and editor of a Plenum book series on public policy.

He is listed in Who's Who In America and Who's Who in the World.

Selected newspaper articles, letters, and op-eds
"The Cost of Virtue" New York Times, June 29, 1980.
"Police Spying Must Be Controlled" Los Angeles Times, April 12, 1983.
"Defects in Government's Entrapment Standard" New York Times, August 28, 1984.
"We're All Under Surveillance" Los Angeles Times, December 1, 1985.
"Boston's Example on Racial Harassment (with Chuck Wexler) Christian Science Monitor, January 14, 1986.
"Drug Foes Aren't High on Civil Liberties" New York Times, February 24, 1986.
"When a Child Informs on Parents" New York Times, August 29, 1986.
"The Company is Watching You Everywhere" New York Times, February 15, 1987.
"Raising Your Hand Just Won't Do" Los Angeles Times, April 1, 1987.
"Make Sure the Video Camera Doesn't Lie" Newsday, October 23, 1988.
"You'd Better Watch Out!  This is the Year of Spying Kits for Kids" Los Angeles Times, December 25, 1988.
"Smile: You're on Candid News" Christian Science Monitor, March 13, 1989.
"DNA 'Fingerprints' May One Day Be Our National ID Card" Wall Street Journal, April 20, 1989.
"When Anonymity of Caller is Lost, We're That Closer to a Surveillance Society" Los Angeles Times, May 3, 1989.
"Dial "P" for "Privacy" in New Telephone Technology" New York Times, August 31, 1989.
"When Doing Wrong Means Doing Right" Law Enforcement News, September 15, 1989.
"Now the Techno-Snoopers Want to Get Into Our Genes" Los Angeles Times, September 15, 1989.
"For Sale: Personal Information About You" Washington Post, December 11, 1989.
"Hang Up on Caller ID" Washington Post, January 29, 1990.
"Bosses Should Nix Job In-scent-ives" Newsday, July 6, 1990.
"Under-the-Covers Undercover Work" Law Enforcement News, February 14, 1991.
"Home Voice Mail Doesn't Guarantee Privacy" New York Times, August 24, 1989
"Communication Advances Raise Privacy Concerns" Christian Science Monitor, June 2, 1992 (part of a World Media Project, "Directions in Science," appearing in 27 newspapers worldwide.)
"Let's Eavesdrop on Managers!" Computerworld, April 20, 1992.
"Challenges of Contemporary Parenting: Effectively Applying Drug Tests for Children" Privacy Journal, November 1998.
"Sex, Truth and Video Tapes: The Case of the French Babysitter" Los Angeles Times, May 28, 2002.
"Are You for Real? Police and Other Impersonators" Newsday, January 16, 2005.
"Camerica? Two Cheers (or less) for the Indiscriminate Spread of Video Cameras in Public Areas" ID Trail Mix, Aug. 2005.
"Who is That Masked Woman? Masking and Unmasking in Public Places" ID Trail Mix. January 2007.
"Trade ‘ya a Sinbad for a Marauder: Drug Fighting, '90s Style" A stillborn Op-Ed article.

References

External links
Profiles and reviews of Gary T. Marx and his work:
 Gary T. Marx home page
 Gary T. Marx's web site bio
 R. Gelbspan, "Undercover Work: A Necessary Evil?" Boston Globe, Nov. 26, 1988
 P. Caughey, "Privacy Pirates: A Professor Warns Of Threats Posed By Sophisticated Technologies." Summit Magazine, Winter 1993
 Maureen Harrington, "Expert: Protect yourself Privacy floats free in cyberspace." Denver Post, September 11, 1995
 Reviews of Undercover: Police Surveillance in America, by Gary T. Marx; and Undercover: Police Surveillance in Comparative Perspective, by Gary T. Marx and Cyrille Fijnaut 
 Reviews of Windows Into The Soul: Surveillance and Society in an Age of High Technology, by Gary T. Marx
 Reviews of Protest and Prejudice, by Gary T. Marx
 Fran Morente interview with Gary T. Marx, October 2019.

1938 births
Living people
Harvard University faculty
MIT School of Humanities, Arts, and Social Sciences faculty
University of Colorado faculty
American sociologists